Gualterio may refer to:

People

 Walter of Albano or Gualterio of Albano (died 1101), cardinal-bishop of the Diocese of Albano, Italy, 1091–1101
 Carlo Gualterio (1613–1673), Italian Roman Catholic cardinal
 Viscount Gualterio (fl. 1705–1723), Giovanni Battista Gualterio, created Earl of Dundee in the Jacobite Peerage, 1705
 Gualterio Looser (1898–1982), Chilean botanist and engineer
 Juan Gualterio Roederer (born 1929), Italian-born American professor of physics
 Filippo Antonio Gualterio (disambiguation), more than one person of the name

Other
 Gualterio family (in the past, also Gualtieri), an aristocratic family from Orvieto, Italy
 Palazzo Gualterio, a palace in Orvieto, Italy
 , a town in Zacatecas, Mexico

See also
 Wouter